Captain's daughter may refer to:

 A character from the comic Maakies
 A character from the short lived series The Drinky Crow Show